Mesestola is a genus of longhorn beetles of the subfamily Lamiinae.

Species
 Mesestola brochieri Touroult, 2007
 Mesestola guadeloupensis Breuning, 1980

References

Calliini